Brazil Nombeko (born 4 July 1982), also known as Biko Brazil is a Dutch former professional footballer who played as a striker.

Club career
Born in Utrecht of Surinamese descent, Brazil played youth football with PSV, FC Utrecht, USV Elinkwijk and FC Den Bosch.

After playing Dutch league football for FC Den Bosch, RKC Waalwijk and FC Omniworld, Brazil later played in Cyprus for APEP Pitsilia and in Belgium for Dessel Sport.

Brazil later returned to Dutch amateur football, playing with WHC Wezep, Be Quick '28, Sparta Nijkerk, Hercules, Echteld and Benschop.

References

1984 births
Living people
Footballers from Utrecht (city)
Dutch sportspeople of Surinamese descent
Association football forwards
Dutch footballers
PSV Eindhoven players
FC Utrecht players
USV Elinkwijk players
FC Den Bosch players
RKC Waalwijk players
Almere City FC players
APEP FC players
K.F.C. Dessel Sport players
WHC Wezep players
Be Quick '28 players
Sparta Nijkerk players
Hercules players
Dutch expatriate footballers
Dutch expatriate sportspeople in Cyprus
Expatriate footballers in Cyprus
Dutch expatriate sportspeople in Belgium
Expatriate footballers in Belgium
Cypriot Second Division players